Paquita Bernardo, nicknamed «La Flor de Villa Crespo» (May 1, 1900, Buenos Aires, Argentina - Ib., April 14, 1925), whose real name was Francisca Cruz Bernardo, was a tango composer and the first professional woman bandoneon player of Argentine tango.

She was the daughter of the marriage of Spanish immigrants José María Bernardo born in 1860 in Almería, Andalucía and emigrated to Buenos Aires in 1887 and her mother María Jiménez, also from southern Spain and ten years younger. Paquita was born in Buenos Aires on Gorriti Street almost on the corner of Canning (whose current name is Scalabrini Ortiz).
They were many brothers: Enrique (1889), Mercedes (1890), Josefina (1891), Arturo (1895), Paquita (1900), Luis (1903), Jose (1906) and María (1911).
She began his primary education at a public school on Padilla Street, by which time her parents had already moved to the neighborhood of Villa Crespo al Pasaje Mangiante (later disappeared) which was located in Camargo 5691 and the sixth grade he attended another school Her parents, who had a good time, sent her to study piano at the conservatory of Professor Catalina Torres in 1915. At the same place, the young José Servidio, nicknamed ", attended to study bandoneon." Balija ", who over the years would become a well-known musician and author of the tango El bulín de la calle Ayacucho. This gave Paquita the opportunity to know that instrument and notice her preference for it, so she began to study it secretly with the help of the method of Augusto Pedro Berto Note that in those years it was considered that the musical instruments of the young women could be the guitar or the piano but that the band oneon, whose execution forced him to open and close his legs, was utterly inappropriate for them; however, with the help of brothers and friends Paquita was able to convince her father to allow her to continue with this instrument and so she received the teachings of Pedro Maffia, who was the same age, and Enrique Garcia.

She composed about fifteen pieces of music, starting with the Floreal tango recorded by Juan Carlos Cobián and following Villa Crespo, Cerro Divino (waltz he composed in homage to Montevideo when she was working in that city)) and Cachito, a tango dedicated to Horacio J. Domínguez who was the son of the owner of Café Domínguez, who became La Emmascarada when Francisco García Jiménez wrote the lyrics and was recorded by Carlos Gardel and also by Roberto Firpo in 1955. She also composed Soñando, with lyrics by Eugenio Cárdenas, a work that received in 1924 the sixth prize in the first tango competition organized at the Grand Splendid Theater by Max Glücksmann. Other works were the tango La Luciérnaga and the pasodobles Dejadme solo and La maja.
Paquita, who did not record any records, died in her neighborhood of Villa Crespo on April 14, 1925 as a result of complications from a poorly maintained cold. Some versions report that her death is explained because she suffered from tuberculosis which aggravated his state of health.

References 

1900 births
1925 deaths
Tango lyricists
Bandoneonists